is a ramen dish that originated in Fukuoka, Fukuoka Prefecture on the Kyushu island of Japan, and it is a speciality dish in both Fukuoka and Kyushu. The soup broth is based on pork bones and other ingredients, which are typically boiled for several hours, and the dish is traditionally topped with sliced pork belly and served with ramen noodles that are hard in the center. In Fukuoka, Japan, tonkotsu ramen is referred to as Hakata ramen.

The soup broth is prepared by boiling pork bones in water for a significant amount of time, up to eighteen hours, and the broth is typically cloudy in appearance. Additional broth ingredients can include onion, garlic, spring onions, ginger, pork back fat, pig's trotters, oil and chicken carcasses. For service, cooked ramen noodles and slices of roasted or braised pork belly are added, and additional ingredients can include kombu, kikurage, shōyu, chili bean paste, sesame seeds and others.

The traditional preparation method for the ramen noodles used in tonkotsu ramen is for the noodles to be hard in the center. Some ramen shops allow customers to select the level of firmness for the noodles, including futsu for regular or standard, harigane for very hard, barikata for al dente and yawamen for soft. Some restaurants also provide a second order of noodles if requested by the customer, in a system referred to as kaedama.

History

Tonkotsu ramen originated in Kurume, Fukuoka Prefecture, which is located on the northern shore of Kyushu island in Japan, and it is a specialty dish in Fukuoka and Kyushu. The dish is  prepared in ramen shops in all other regions of Japan. Tonkotsu ramen was originally prepared as an affordable and easily prepared fast food for laborers at fish markets. In contemporary times, tonkotsu ramen is renowned for the significant time it can take to prepare a proper version of the dish.

See also
 Japanese regional cuisine
 List of ramen dishes

References

Further reading
  200 pages.

External links
 

Ramen dishes
Japanese cuisine